In mathematics and computer science, a random tree is a tree or arborescence that is formed by a stochastic process. Types of random trees include:
Uniform spanning tree, a spanning tree of a given graph in which each different tree is equally likely to be selected
Random minimal spanning tree, spanning trees of a graph formed by choosing random edge weights and using the minimum spanning tree for those weights
Random binary tree, binary trees with a given number of nodes, formed by inserting the nodes in a random order or by selecting all possible trees uniformly at random
Random recursive tree, increasingly labelled trees, which can be generated using a simple stochastic growth rule.
Treap or randomized binary search tree, a data structure that uses random choices to simulate a random binary tree for non-random update sequences
Rapidly exploring random tree, a fractal space-filling pattern used as a data structure for searching high-dimensional spaces
Brownian tree, a fractal tree structure created by diffusion-limited aggregation processes
Random forest, a machine-learning classifier based on choosing random subsets of variables for each tree and using the most frequent tree output as the overall classification
Branching process, a model of a population in which each individual has a random number of children

See also
Lightning tree

External links

Trees (graph theory)
Probabilistic data structures
Random graphs